In geometry, the pentaapeirogonal tiling is a uniform tiling of the hyperbolic plane with a Schläfli symbol of r{∞,5}.

Related polyhedra and tiling

See also

List of uniform planar tilings
Tilings of regular polygons
Uniform tilings in hyperbolic plane

References

 John H. Conway, Heidi Burgiel, Chaim Goodman-Strass, The Symmetries of Things 2008,  (Chapter 19, The Hyperbolic Archimedean Tessellations)

External links 

Apeirogonal tilings
Hyperbolic tilings
Isogonal tilings
Isotoxal tilings
Uniform tilings